Luigi Da Porto (1485 in Vicenza – 10 May 1529) was an Italian writer and storiographer, better known as the author of the novel Novella novamente ritrovata with the story of Romeo and Juliet, later reprised by William Shakespeare for his famous drama.

Da Porto wrote the novel in his villa in Montorso Vicentino near Vicenza before June 1524, and dedicated it to his cousin Lucina Savorgnan. The novel was published posthumously and anonymously about 1531 in Venice with the title Historia novellamente ritrovata di due nobili amanti ("Newly found story of two noble lovers"). The origin of the story of the two unlucky lovers is disputed; however, Da Porto probably took the inspiration from a tale by Masuccio Salernitano called Mariotto e Ganozza, introducing many modern elements reprised by Shakespeare's drama.

Some inspiration may have stemmed from da Porto's own experiences: on 26 February 1511, the day before the Cruel Fat Thursday in Udine, he apparently fell in love with the sixteen-year-old (or older) Lucina Sarvognan, who enchanted a ball with her singing. However, at the time, the conflicts between and within Friulian clans were at a critical point. Da Porto was very close to his uncle  but unfortunately, Antonio's relationship with Lucina's guardian Girolamo Savorgnan was at a nadir.  Years later, badly wounded and paralyzed from his battles, Luigi wrote the novella in his villa. Although the setting of the story is Verona, the inspiration for the idea of two warring families came from the two castles of Montecchio Maggiore, which he could see from his window in his villa. He dedicated the work to Lucina, who by then had become married to Francesco Savorgnan, another of Antonio's nephews.

Da Porto set the story in Verona (at that time, a strategic city for Venice), during the signoria of Bartolomeo I della Scala (1301–1304), but from some detail, the urban structure resembles more that of Udine. He created the names of Romeo (later Romeus) and Giulietta (soon to be Juliet in England) and even created the characters of Mercutio, Tybalt, Friar Laurence and Paris.

References

External links

1485 births
1529 deaths
16th-century Italian writers
16th-century male writers
16th-century Italian novelists
People from Vicenza
Romeo and Juliet